François Cointeraux (1740–1830) was a French architect. He "discovered" pisé de terre (rammed earth) architecture in the Lyon region and promulgated its use in Paris.

Born in Lyon, he is the nephew of a master mason, with whom he learns drawing, architecture and perspective. He starts working in his city of birth and in Grenoble as a construction entrepreneur and a land surveyor for Lyon until 1786, when he enters an examination of the Academy of Amiens, he is received in 1787, and moves to Paris the following year. There, he establishes several schools of rural architecture. His work at that time was mainly oriented towards the construction of incombustible rammed earth buildings built for agricultural purposes. In 1789, he is distinguished by the Royal Society of Agriculture of Paris. In year III of the revolutionary calendar, he is part of the Société des inventions et découvertes.

He is the inventor of the crécise a mechanical device allowing the production of rammed earth bricks, he derives from this device another invention, l'épurateur de légumes, allowing to dry vegetables. He also invents the pierre carton and studies concrete.

He was a productive author, producing 72 booklets relating to rammed earth construction, and these writings were translated and widely spread, helping this construction style to flourish. He is also interested in agriculture, being the first author, with Léon de Perthuis de Laillevault in 1805 and 1810, to study rural construction in the French agronomy, in an apology of rammed earth and its use. He is also interested in manufactures built in an industrial style.

He is the architect of dozens of rammed earth buildings in Lyon and its vicinity, in Grenoble, Amiens and Napoléon-Vendée, a town he was tasked to rebuild in 1807 by Emmanuel Crétet, Minister of the Interior and director of the Corps of Bridges, Waters and Forests of Napoleon. The town, destroyed during the French Revolution, was rebuilt by Cointeraux, his use of rammed earth is criticized by the Emperor, which describes his work as a "city of mud", and he is blamed of having wasted the means available to him.

Published works

References 

1740 births
1830 deaths
18th-century French architects
19th-century French architects
Architects from Lyon